Bischdorf (Lower Sorbian: Wótšowc) is a village and former municipality in the Oberspreewald-Lausitz district of Brandenburg, Germany. It is located in Lusatia about 90 km (55 mi) south of Berlin. Since 26 October 2003, Bischdorf is part of the town Lübbenau.

History 

Bischdorf was founded around the year 1200 as an so called Angerdorf and first mentioned in 1415. The German name Bischdorf derived from the Bishopric of Meissen, by which the village was owned at the time. The Lower Sorbian name Wótšowc can be translated as small island. After Bischdorf was destroyed during the Thirty Years' War, it was rebuilt and resettled in 1652. During the 17th and 18th century, Bischdorf was divided into two parts, one of which belonged to Margraviate of Brandenburg. The other part of Bischdorf belonged to the Electorate of Saxony. In 1815, the entire village became part of the Prussian Province of Brandenburg. After the construction of the Lübbenau–Kamenz railway in 1874, Bischdorf got a Freight depot, which was later also used as a railway station. Since 1952, Bischdorf was part of the Bezirk Cottbus in the German Democratic Republic. In 1960, the mining of Lignite began. As a result, three buildings inside the village had to be demolished. After the German reunification, Bischdorf became part of the state Brandenburg. In 1996, the lignite mining ended and the former quarry is turned into a lake.

On 1 January 1969, the then municipality Bischdorf annexed the municipality Seese with its district Mlode. In the same year, Seese was destroyed in favor of lignite mining. On 1 June 1987, Mlode regained independence as a municipality, it is now a district of Calau (since 2003). On 1 January 1987, the Gemarkung of the former village Kahnsdorf became part of Bischdorf. Bischdorf itself was annexed by Lübbenau on 26 October 2003.

Demographics

References

External links 

Populated places in Oberspreewald-Lausitz